Rana Sura Padakkama (RSP, Combat Excellence Medal) (Sinhala: රණ ශූර පදක්කම rana śūra padakkama) is awarded to servicepersons of all ranks of the regular and volunteer forces of the Military of Sri Lanka for individual acts of bravery and otherwise distinguished conduct in the face of the enemy during active deployment. Bars could be awarded for further acts of gallantry meriting the award for a second and third time, denoted by a star in the ribbon bar for each additional award.

Award process
The decoration is awarded at the National Day parade by the President after a recommendation and review process initiated by service commanders. Recipients can use the post-nominal letters "RSP".

Notable decorated personnel
Field Marshal Sarath Fonseka
Major-General Wasantha Perera
Admiral Thisara Samarasinghe
Admiral Wasantha Karannagoda
Admiral Jayanath Colombage
Lieutenant General Denzil Kobbekaduwa 
Lieutenant General Parami Kulatunga 
Air Vice Marshal P.B. Premachandra
Air Vice Marshal Harsha Abeywickrama
Major-General Ananda Hamangoda 
Major-General Lucky Wijayaratne 
Major-General Vijaya Wimalaratne 
Major-General Sarath Munasinghe
Major-General Janaka Perera
Major General Laksiri Waduge
Rear Admiral   Mohan Wijewickrama
Rear admiral Susith Weerasekara
Rear admiral Ravindra Wijegunaratne
Rear admiral Rohan Amarasinghe
Rear admiral Sarath Dissanayake
Brigadier Rohitha Neil Akmeemana
Brigadier D.H.M.R.B.Tammita
Brigadier Udene Kendaragama
Air Commodore Shirantha Goonatilake 
Major-General Fadyl Meedin (Twice)
Colonel A. F. Lafir 
Lieutenant Colonel  J.A.L Jayasinghe 
Lieutenant Colonel Gotabhaya Rajapaksa
Major General Nandana Senadeera
Lieutenant Colonel Dhananjaya Weerabahu Wijesinghe 
Commodore N.A.N. Sarathsena
Lieutenant Commander S.W. Gallage
Lieutenant Commander T.R. Dahanayaka
Lieutenant Commander HMWM Thilakarathna
Lieutenant Commander HMWM Thilakarathna
 COMMANDER (PRO) C.P ABEYGUNASEKARA, RSP
Wing Commander Thilina Chandima Kaluarachchi
Squadron Leader Dihan Fernando
Squadron Leader Amal Wahid
 Flying Officer Chinthaka Hettiarachchi 
Warrant Officer 1 J.P Gunapala
Vice Admiral Travis Sinniah
Major General Pradeep De Silva
Major General S A D A D Gunawardena

References

External links
Sri Lanka Army
Sri Lanka Navy
Sri Lanka Air Force
Ministry of Defence : Sri Lanka

Military awards and decorations of Sri Lanka
Awards established in 1981